K2-155d is a potentially habitable Super-Earth exoplanet in the K2-155 system. It is the outermost of three known planets orbiting around the K-type star K2-155 in the constellation Taurus. It is one of 15 new exoplanets around red dwarf stars discovered by Japanese astronomer "Teruyuki Hirano" of the Tokyo Institute of Technology and his team. The team used data from NASA's Kepler Space Telescope during its extended K2 "Second Light" mission. K2-155d orbits near the so-called habitable zone of its system, and has the potential to host liquid water.

Discovery and observations
K2-155d is one of 15 exoplanets discovered by a team of Japanese astronomers led by Teruyuki Hirano at the Tokyo Institute of Technology. Its discovery is based on data from the K2 mission of NASA's Kepler spacecraft. The exoplanet has also been observed from ground-based telescopes including the Nordic Optical Telescope (NOT) in La Palma and the Subaru Telescope in Hawaii. Its characteristics were confirmed using speckle imaging and high-dispersion optical spectroscopy. The mass of K2-155d and the brightness of its host star may be measured by future observations from the W. M. Keck Observatory and the James Webb Space Telescope. The brightness of its host star makes K2-155d a good target for future studies using instruments such as the James Webb Space Telescope.

Characteristics
K2-155d is a super-Earth exoplanet with a radius 1.64 times that of Earth, near the transition zone between small rock-based and larger gaseous planets. Climate models predict that it is located near its star's habitable zone and has an insolation 1.67 ± 0.38 (between 1.29 and 2.05) times that of Earth. Its physical temperature is estimated to be 289 K (16 degrees Celsius or 61 degrees Fahrenheit). Studies have shown that the planet would maintain a moderate surface temperature if its insolation is smaller than ∼1.5 times that of Earth.

K2-155d is one of three known planets in the system orbiting K2-155, a red dwarf star located 200 light years from Earth. Its parent star has 88% less volume than the Sun. K2-155d orbits its star with a 40.7 day period, but as the planet is tidally locked the same side always faces its sun. K2-155d has an orbital radius of 0.1886AU and studies suggest that the planet has a low orbital eccentricity.

Potential habitability
K2-155d has been labeled a potentially habitable planet that may be able to harbor liquid water. A three-dimensional climate simulation was used to confirm the possibility of the existence of water. However, its discoverer Teruyuki Hirano was cautious about the findings, stating that they do not guarantee K2-155d is habitable, as the ranges in its orbit and temperature allow the possibility of it being outside the habitable zone. Factors such as the absence of solar flares could also decide if K2-155d is habitable.

References

Exoplanets discovered in 2018
Super-Earths in the habitable zone
Taurus (constellation)
Transiting exoplanets
Discoveries by the Mauna Kea Observatories
155